Taking Back My Life: The Nancy Ziegenmeyer Story is a 1992 American made-for-television drama film about a rape victim who spoke out about her experiences and created the notion that rape and sexual assault are never the victim's fault.

This true story inspired other victims who felt shame about what had happened to them to speak out. Rape victim Nancy Ziegenmeyer spoke openly about her experiences, including with the hospital, the police, prosecutors, the accused, and the criminal justice system.

Book
Nancy Ziegenmeyer wrote the book, Taking Back My Life, to encourage women to seek help after they've been victimized.

Pulitzer Prize
The Des Moines Register won the Pulitzer Prize for Public Service in 1991 for publishing the story regarding Nancy Ziegenmeyer.

Cast
 Patricia Wettig as Nancy Ziegenmeyer
 Joanna Cassidy  as Geneva Overholser
 Shelley Hack    as Nan Horvat
 Ellen Burstyn   as Vicky Martin

See also

 Post-assault treatment of sexual assault victims
 Social stigma
 Victim blaming

References

External links
 

1992 television films
1992 films
1992 drama films
American drama television films
CBS network films
Films directed by Harry Winer
1990s English-language films
1990s American films